This is a list of Xbox 360 games that are compatible with the System Link feature, both released and unreleased, organized alphabetically by name. A system link connects two or more 360 consoles together without an internet connection. For original Xbox games, please see List of Xbox System Link games.

See also
 List of Xbox System Link games
 List of Xbox 360 games
 List of Xbox games
 Lists of video games
 List of cooperative games for the Xbox 360

References

External links
 Mobygames System Link List 
 XLink Kai System Link List 

Xbox 360
System link games